The Due Ponti Cup is a professional tennis tournament played on outdoor clay courts. It is currently part of the Association of Tennis Professionals (ATP) Challenger Tour. It is held annually in Rome, Italy, since 2010.

Past finals

Singles

Doubles

External links
Lawn Tennis Association (LTA) official website
ITF search

ATP Challenger Tour
Tennis tournaments in Italy
Sports competitions in Rome
Clay court tennis tournaments